Società Calcistica Caronnese S.S.D., is an Italian association football club located in Caronno Pertusella, Lombardy. It currently plays in Serie D.

History
The club was founded in 2009 as Società Calcistica Insubria CaronneseTurate A.S.D. after the merger of Gruppo Sportivo Salus et Virtus Turate (founded in 1927 in Turate in Serie D) and Unione Sportiva Caronnese (founded in 1932 in Caronno Pertusella in Eccellenza).

In 2010 it was renamed Società Calcistica Insubria Caronnese A.S.D. and it took the current denomination in the summer 2011.

Colors and badge
The colors of the team are red and blue.

References

External links
 Official site

Football clubs in Italy
Association football clubs established in 2009
Football clubs in Lombardy
2009 establishments in Italy
Caronno Pertusella